Denys Serhiyovych Shevchenko (born 3 April 2003) is a Ukrainian professional footballer who plays as a midfielder for Kryvbas Kryvyi Rih.

Career

Early years
Shevchenko began his career at Shakhtar Kryvyi Rih and then continued at the Shakhtar Donetsk academy.

Shakhtar Donetsk
He played in the Ukrainian Premier League Reserves until May 2021 and never made his debut for the senior Shakhtar Donetsk squad.

Kryvbas Kryvyi Rih
In September 2021 Shevchenko signed a contract with the newly promoted Ukrainian Premier League side Kryvbas Kryvyi Rih and made his league debut as a second half-time substitute player in the losing away match against Kolos Kovalivka on 23 August 2022.

References

External links
 
 

2003 births
Living people
Place of birth missing (living people)
Ukrainian footballers
Ukraine youth international footballers
Association football midfielders
FC Kryvbas Kryvyi Rih players
Ukrainian Premier League players